The 1983 Eastern Michigan Hurons football team represented Eastern Michigan University in the 1983 NCAA Division I-A football season. In their first season under head coach Jim Harkema, the Hurons compiled a 1–10 record (0–9 against conference opponents), finished in last place in the Mid-American Conference, and were outscored by their opponents, 276 to 134. The team's statistical leaders included Steve Coulter with 1,827 passing yards, Ricky Calhoun with 871 rushing yards, and Derrin Powell with 582 receiving yards.

Schedule

References

Eastern Michigan
Eastern Michigan Eagles football seasons
Eastern Michigan Hurons football